Arctostaphylos pallida, commonly known as pallid manzanita, Oakland Hills manzanita, and Alameda manzanita, is an upright manzanita shrub from the Ericaceae, or heath family.  It is endemic to the eastern San Francisco Bay Area of Northern California.

Description
The branches on the shrub are reddish or grayish (more reddish) and they have twigs that tend to be bristly. The ovate to triangular leaves are bristly, strongly overlapping and clasping.

The flowering period is from November to March.

A. pallida commonly co-occurs with another manzanita species, brittle leaf manzanita (Arctostaphylos tomentosa ssp. crustacea), but the latter is a burl-forming species with spreading leaves. A. pallida does not form burls.

Distribution 
The plants are found in manzanita chaparral habitat of the montane chaparral and woodlands ecosystem, and is frequently surrounded by oak woodlands and other chaparral shrubs.

Endemism
Arctostaphylos pallida is known from approximately 13 populations in Alameda and Contra Costa counties. The two largest populations, which are owned by the East Bay Regional Park District, are located at Huckleberry Ridge—Huckleberry Botanic Regional Preserve in Alameda and Contra Costa Counties and at Sobrante Ridge Regional Park in Contra Costa County.

Several other small, natural and planted populations occur in Alameda and Contra Costa counties. These two populations are found in maritime sage and chaparral, a habitat with mesic soil conditions and a maritime influence. Many smaller populations occur in coastal scrub.

Threats 
The primary threats to the species are the effects of fire suppression, and shading and competition from native plants, and introduced and invasive species. To a lesser extent, the species is threatened by fungal infection, herbicide spraying, hybridization, construction of roads, and the ongoing effects of habitat fragmentation and loss.

This is a federally listed threatened species. It was listed as an endangered species by the California Department of Fish and Game in November 1997. The California Native Plant Society has placed it on List 1B (rare or endangered throughout its range).

See also
List of California native plants
Index: Endemic flora of California

References

External links

Jepson Manual Treatment: Arctostaphylos pallida
USDA Plants Profile - Arctostaphylos pallida (Alameda manzanita)
Arctostaphylos pallida - U.C. Photo gallery

pallida
Endemic flora of California
Endemic flora of the San Francisco Bay Area
Natural history of the California chaparral and woodlands
~
Natural history of Alameda County, California
Natural history of Contra Costa County, California